Tanvir Mahmood Ahmed  (Urdu: تنویر محمود احمد;  died 2022) is a retired air chief  of the Pakistan Air Force who was the Chief of the Air Staff from 2006 to 2009. He was succeeded by Rao Qamar Suleman on 18 March 2009.

Initial training and education
Tanvir Ahmed got his initial education from Central Model High school in Lahore, and subsequently, he did his F Sc from PAF Public School Sargodha where he belonged to 15th entry (767 – Fury House). Thereafter, he joined PAF Academy, Risalpur in 1969 and was commissioned in Pakistan Air Force as a fighter pilot on 15 April 1972 in the 53rd GD(P) Course. During his training at Risalpur, he flew and qualified as a jet pilot on T-37 aircraft.

Air Force career
Air Marshal Tanvir is a Qualified Flying Instructor (QFI) and a graduate of Combat Commanders School (CCS). He has commanded the CCS Mirage Squadron, No. 38 Flying Wing, PAF Base Sargodha and his alma mater the PAF Academy, Risalpur. He has flown the American F-86 Sabre, Chinese MiG-15, F-6, F-7, French Mirage-3 and Mirage-5. Additionally, he flew the F-16 Fighting Falcon aircraft during his last 20 years of service in the PAF. He has also flown many training aircraft and has vast experience as a flying / fighter instructor.

The Air Marshal has also served in United Arab Emirates Air Force as a fighter instructor pilot during 1979 - 1983.

Staff commands
As a Wing Commander (Lt Col) Tanvir served as deputy director in the Operations branch at AHQs before serving as Personal Staff Officer (PSO) with two Chiefs of Air Staff. As an Air Commodore, he had a lengthy tenure as Chief Project Director of the F-16 system. At senior staff assignments, Tanvir first served as Deputy Chief of Air Staff for Administration and then Operations branch. Before taking over the PAF, he was the Vice Chief of Air Staff for over  years. He took over as VCAS on 13 October 2003.

Tanvir M. Ahmed was promoted to Air Vice Marshal in January 2000 and to Air Marshal rank on 7 August 2002.

Chief of Air Staff
He took over as the 18th Chief of Air Staff (CAS), PAF on 18 March 2006, when the previous chief completed his three-year term. Having been in the office of Vice Chief for well over two years, Tanvir was fully ready to role out his vision and plan for the PAF for the next three years.  His vast and varied experience helped him in preparing a thorough and very ambitious plan for the PAF. He wished to see the PAF truly transitioning into the 21st century along with procurement of essential hardware and development of infrastructure. His motto for the PAF was To-do-more-with-less and build PAF as a lean, very efficient and hard hitting Air Force. Towards these objectives, he launched a massive drive to bring the entire working/functioning of the PAF online and fully integrated. Procurement of new generation F-16s (Block-52), Spada SAMs, Chinese AWACS, Swedish AEW&C, locally upgraded/maintained and operationalized Air Defense system, Retrieval of Peace Gate-IV F-16s from the USAF, complete upgradation of older F-16 fleet to most modern version, procurement of highly potent Beyond Visual Range AAMs along with host of other weapons from the US, High Tech Simulators, induction and local manufacturing capability of UAVs, a highly versatile Automated Inventory Management System and local manufacturing of Block-1 of the JF-17 weapon system were some of the major inductions that were contracted by him and in due course inducted in the PAF. Other than these new procurements to make PAF a very potent force, Tanvir was also responsible for operationalization of strategic capability for the PAF. This he achieved over a period of five years while concurrently holding the position of DG, AWC along with his primary responsibilities in the PAF.
In addition to the above, Tanvir focused on developing and upgrading physical infrastructure, both operational and domestic. He especially built a lot of accommodation for the low paid employees in addition to building a major new air base for housing of new F-16s and upgrading Skardu as a fully functional air base. He had a keen eye for the welfare of PAF personnel and built hospitals in Karachi and Lahore. By bringing the PAF online, he streamlined all of the budgeting, logistics, procurements and accounting systems of the PAF.

Criticism of US drone attacks inside Pakistan
Air Marshal Tanvir Mahmood Ahmad during his tenure expressed PAF's capability to be able to stop US drone attacks inside Pakistan as he considered it a violation of Pakistan's sovereignty. However, in his opinion such military actions needed approval from the government, before PAF could go on to take such action. Saying at one point: "The decision as to whether or not we want to start a war [with the US] will have to be made by the nation and the government."

National Girl Child Day photograph
Air Chief Marshal Tanvir Mahmood Ahmad appeared in a full-page newspaper advertisement (see External Links below) taken out by the government of India's Ministry of Women and Child Development to mark the National Girl Child Day. Krishna Tirath, Minister of Women and Child Development, apologised on behalf of her ministry for publishing a photograph of a former Pakistan Air Force chief in a government advertisement and said an inquiry will ascertain who was responsible for it. Ahmed, upon learning of the publication, "wasn't aware about this [and felt it was] an innocent mistake".

Awards and decorations

Foreign decorations

References

External links 
 PAF's Chief of Air Staffs
 Tanvir Mahmood Ahmed in National Girl Child Day advertisement

 

Chiefs of Air Staff, Pakistan
Pakistan Air Force air marshals
Pakistan Air Force officers
Pakistani aviators
1952 births
Living people
People of the insurgency in Khyber Pakhtunkhwa
National Defence University, Pakistan alumni
Pakistani expatriates in the United Arab Emirates
PAF College Sargodha alumni